Julien Mari (born 14 January 1990), better known as Jul (stylized as JuL and in all caps), is a French rapper, singer, and producer.

In February 2020, he became the biggest record seller in the history of French rap with more than four million albums sold at the age of 30, and in six years of career.

Biography 
Jul was born in the 12th arrondissement of Marseille.

Career
Jul released his first single "Sors le cross volé" in November 2013. On 24 February 2014, he released his debut album, "Dans ma paranoïa" on the independent Liga One Industry label. It was the first of a prolific series. Since the beginning of his career, he has released at least two LPs per year, all reaching the platinum certification or greater. His debut was followed by "Lacrizeomic" and "Je trouve pas le sommeil". All three have reached the French SNEP official albums chart.

In 2015, Jul left Liga One Industry following disagreements with the label, and he independently released his album "D'Or et De Platine". In 2017, his album "My World" won the "Urban Music Album of the Year" at the 32nd Victoires de la Musique.

In February 2020, he became the best-selling artist in French rap history. By the age of 30 and within a career with a spanning just 6 years, he has sold more than 4 million albums.

Discography

Albums

Singles 

*Did not appear in the official Belgian Ultratop 50 charts, but rather in the bubbling under Ultratip charts.

Other charting songs

Featured in

References 

1990 births
Living people
Musicians from Marseille
Rappers from Bouches-du-Rhône